Un Chau is one of the 25 constituencies in the Sham Shui Po District of Hong Kong.

It was first created for the 1994 District Board election and was abolished in 2011 due to the redevelopment of Un Chau Estate and the resettlement of the population. It was re-created from Un Chau & So Uk for the 2019 District Council elections. The constituency returns one district councillor to the Sham Shui Po District Council, with an election every four years.

Un Chau loosely covers part of the public housing estate Un Chau Estate in Cheung Sha Wan. It has projected population of 18,422.

Councillors represented

Election results

2010s

2000s

1990s

References

Cheung Sha Wan
Constituencies of Hong Kong
Constituencies of Sham Shui Po District Council
2019 establishments in Hong Kong
Constituencies established in 2019
1994 establishments in Hong Kong
Constituencies established in 1994